Dmitry Gurevich (born September 11, 1956) is a Russian-American chess player who holds the FIDE title of Grandmaster.

Born in Moscow, Gurevich emigrated to New York City in 1980 and earned the Grandmaster (GM) title three years later. Dmitry has tied or won the U.S. Open four times (in 1988, 1994, 2009, and 2012). Also, Gurevich has had especially good results at the National Open in Las Vegas, sharing first place on numerous occasions, e.g. 1985, 1986, 1990, 1991, 1996, 1997, and 2005. He has been a regular finisher at the top of North American events as well as a regular participant in the U.S. Invitational Championship.

References

External links
 
 
 
 

1956 births
Living people
American chess players
Russian chess players
Jewish chess players
Chess grandmasters
American people of Russian-Jewish descent
Russian Jews
Sportspeople from Moscow